Golovkovo is the name of several rural localities in Russia.

Leningrad Oblast
As of 2012, one rural locality in Leningrad Oblast bears this name:
Golovkovo, Leningrad Oblast, a village in Anisimovskoye Settlement Municipal Formation of Boksitogorsky District;

Moscow Oblast
As of 2012, three rural localities in Moscow Oblast bear this name:
Golovkovo, Klinsky District, Moscow Oblast, a village under the administrative jurisdiction of the Town of Klin in Klinsky District
Golovkovo, Naro-Fominsky District, Moscow Oblast, a village in Tashirovskoye Rural Settlement of Naro-Fominsky District
Golovkovo, Solnechnogorsky District, Moscow Oblast, a village in Smirnovskoye Rural Settlement of Solnechnogorsky District

Nizhny Novgorod Oblast
As of 2012, one rural locality in Nizhny Novgorod Oblast bears this name:
Golovkovo, Nizhny Novgorod Oblast, a village under the administrative jurisdiction of the town of district significance of Lyskovo in Lyskovsky District

Novgorod Oblast
As of 2012, one rural locality in Novgorod Oblast bears this name:
Golovkovo, Novgorod Oblast, a village in Zhirkovskoye Settlement of Demyansky District

Smolensk Oblast
As of 2012, one rural locality in Smolensk Oblast bears this name:
Golovkovo, Smolensk Oblast, a village in Izvekovskoye Rural Settlement of Novoduginsky District

Tver Oblast
As of 2012, six rural localities in Tver Oblast bear this name:
Golovkovo, Bologovsky District, Tver Oblast, a village in Vypolzovskoye Rural Settlement of Bologovsky District
Golovkovo, Kalyazinsky District, Tver Oblast, a village in Starobislovskoye Rural Settlement of Kalyazinsky District
Golovkovo, Krasnokholmsky District, Tver Oblast, a village in Glebenskoye Rural Settlement of Krasnokholmsky District
Golovkovo, Toropetsky District, Tver Oblast, a village in Pozhinskoye Rural Settlement of Toropetsky District
Golovkovo, Vesyegonsky District, Tver Oblast, a village in Romanovskoye Rural Settlement of Vesyegonsky District
Golovkovo, Zubtsovsky District, Tver Oblast, a village in Vazuzskoye Rural Settlement of Zubtsovsky District

Vologda Oblast
As of 2012, one rural locality in Vologda Oblast bears this name:
Golovkovo, Vologda Oblast, a village in Votchinsky Selsoviet of Vologodsky District

Yaroslavl Oblast
As of 2012, two rural localities in Yaroslavl Oblast bear this name:
Golovkovo, Bolsheselsky District, Yaroslavl Oblast, a khutor in Blagoveshchensky Rural Okrug of Bolsheselsky District
Golovkovo, Uglichsky District, Yaroslavl Oblast, a village in Vasilevsky Rural Okrug of Uglichsky District